Nollen is both a surname and a given name. Notable people with the name include:

 Maike Nollen (born 1977), German canoer
 Nollen Cornelius Leni, Solomon Islands politician
 Scott Allen Nollen (born 1963), American author

See also 
 Reissend Nollen, Swiss mountain